New Compton Street is a street in the London Borough of Camden that runs from Stacey Street in the south to St Giles High Street in the north. It is crossed only by St Giles Passage. At its southern end, on the western side, is the Phoenix Garden and the rear of the Odeon Covent Garden cinema, formerly the Saville Theatre, on the other side of the street.

See also
Old Compton Street

References

External links 

Streets in the London Borough of Camden